Webster Parish School Board is a school district headquartered in Minden in northwestern Louisiana, United States. The district operates public schools in Webster Parish.

The district is governed by an elected and compensated school board.  Daniel R. Rawls begins duties as superintendent on January 7, 2014.  In 2017, Johnny Rowland, Jr., was unanimously chosen by the school board as the superintendent to succeed Rawls.

Schools

Primary schools
PK-6
 Central Elementary School (Unincorporated area/near Heflin)
5-6
 Brown Upper Elementary School (Springhill)
PK and 6
 Philips Middle School (Minden)
K-5
 J. E. Harper Elementary School (Minden) opened in 1971 as a "new concept" school with one large open space without separate classroom and doors. Joe Windham, the former elementary school supervisor, became the first Harper principal.
 Jones Elementary School (Minden)
 E.S. Richardson Elementary School (Minden), grades 4 and 5
 William G. Stewart Elementary School (Minden), closed and razed in 2011
 Union Elementary School (Doyline), closed 2011

Secondary schools
6-8
 North Webster Jr. High School (Sarepta)
7-8
 Webster Junior High School (Minden)
6-12
 Doyline High School (Doyline)
7-12
Lakeside Junior-Senior High School (Unincorporated area/south of Sibley)
9-12
 Minden High School (Minden)
 North Webster High School (Springhill)

Alternative
 Hope Youth Ranch (Evergreen Community), closed
 Webster Parish Achievement Center (Minden)

References

External links
 Webster Parish School Board

School districts in Louisiana
School Board